Money for Madagascar is a UK charity (registration number 1001420) founded in Wales in 1986. The charity now has offices in Lancaster, Llangadog and Antananarivo, Madagascar.

Money for Madagascar invests in Malagasy-led solutions to reduce poverty and protect the environment in Madagascar. MfM works with 15 Malagasy NGO partners, who support local conservation and development in over 100 communities.

Money for Madagascar typically funds projects in the following areas: conservation, education, disaster relief and sustainable development. MfM backs ‘Malagasy Solutions to Malagasy Challenges’ : supporting and strengthening Malagasy organisations and communities to build their own resilience. Taking an integrated WHEELS approach MfM Programmes strengthen Water, Health, Education, Environment, Livelihoods and Sanitation, which all work together to build a Rim of Resilience.

Programme activities typically tackle issues such as poverty, deforestation, food security, preventable illnesses, illiteracy and innumeracy and access to clean water.

History and beginnings

Money for Madagascar was founded in 1986 to invest in Malagasy-led development and conservation solutions.

Work

Money for Madagascar operates by funding programmes devised and managed by development partners in Madagascar.

Areas of activity

Projects that Money for Madagascar funds typically focus on one or more of the following areas:
 Conservation
 Sustainable development
 Public health
 Supporting vulnerable children and young people
 Disaster Relief & Resilience for Famine, Cyclones etc
 Education

Money for Madagascar has funded projects in both rural and urban communities and in locations across Madagascar.

Beneficiaries

Money for Madagascar's principal beneficiaries are:
 Destitute children
 Vulnerable young women and girls
 Young people with physical or learning disabilities
 Impoverished families
 Communities living in or around ecological hotspots

Partners

Money for Madagascar employs no expatriate staff in Madagascar but instead operates by funding projects managed by local development partners. These include:

 Association Miarintsoa
 Akany Avoko Ambohidratrimo & Bevalala Children's Centre (FFPM)
 Akany Hasina
 Akany TsinjoHasina 
 Association Voary Maitso
 Association Mitsinjo
 Madagasikara Voakajy
 Ankizy Gasy
 SAF/FJKM
 Centre Fihavanana -Sisters of the Good Shepherd
 Topaza FJKM Children's Centre
 ALT - Famine Relief in Southern Madagascar
 MDI
 Association WtdM
 ONG Sadabe
 Madagascar Biodiversity Partnership

Money for Madagascar's strategic Partners and Funding Partners include:
 The Adsum Foundation
 Mary's Meals
 Nature Fund
 Rainforest Trust
 The Darwin Initiative
 Solar Aid
 Solar United
 Feedback Madagascar
 SEED
 MDF
 Kuanza MIA
 Anglo-Malagasy Society
 Friends of Madagascar
 Association of Malagasy Residents in Britain
 FANC
 Alliance Voary Gasy
 Bird Life International -ASITY
 ESSA Forests
 Bangor University Researchers including Prof Julia Jones
 Lancaster University - Lancaster Environment Centre
 Madagascar Education Authorities (MEN, DREN, CISCO, ZAP)
 Madagascar National Office for Nutrition ONN
 Madagascar National Parks (MNP)
 HUB Cymru Africa https://hubcymruafrica.wales.
 INTRAC
 FSI
 Chatham House
 GLF
 UWI
 Caplor Horizons
 Better World Books

Secure Funding Platforms that take Donations for Money for Madagascar include:
 Paypal Giving Fund https://www.paypal.com/GB/fundraiser/charity/3242237
 JustGiving https://www.justgiving.com/moneyformadagascar
 B1G1 https://account.b1g1.com/wcu_partner/254
 The Big Give https://moneyformadagascar.org/big-give-christmas-challenge/
 Money for Madagascar's website donation page https://moneyformadagascar.org/donate/

Follow Money for Madagascar's News on the MfM official website https://moneyformadagascar.org and on MfM socials on facebook, twitter @MfMadagascar.org and instagram

Organisation

Staff

Money for Madagascar is a UK charity which has been raising funds for over 36 years.  In the UK we have a small team based in Lancaster and Llangadog, backed by a board of Malagasy and British trustees and volunteers across the UK, Madagascar and beyond. In 2016 we opened a MfM office in Madagascar, which is run by our dynamic Malagasy team ‘AMI’. Our AMI team  provide support, training and monitoring to MfM’s 15 Malagasy NGO partners, who support over 100 communities.

Patrons
Our patrons include experts in international development, Malagasy wildlife and Malagasy history – including the conservationist Dr Lee Durrell, the travel guide Hilary Bradt and the former Ambassador & Anglo-Malagasy Society President  Sir Mervyn Brown.

 Rt Hon Donald Anderson, Baron Anderson of Swansea
 Hilary Bradt MBE
 Sir Mervyn Brown KCMG
 Dr Lee Durrell
 Dr Barbara and Dr Allan Prys-Williams

External links
 Money for Madagascar Official Website

References

Organizations established in 1986
Organisations based in Wales